In recreational mathematics, a polystick (or polyedge) is a polyform with a line segment (a 'stick') as the basic shape.  A polystick is a connected set of segments in a regular grid.  A square polystick is a connected subset of a regular square grid.    A triangular polystick is a connected subset of a regular triangular grid.  Polysticks are classified according to how many line segments they contain.

The name "polystick" seems to have been first coined by Brian R. Barwell.

The names "polytrig" and "polytwigs" has been proposed by David Goodger to simplify the phrases "triangular-grid polysticks" and "hexagonal-grid polysticks," respectively. Colin F. Brown has used an earlier term "polycules" for the hexagonal-grid polysticks due to their appearance resembling the spicules of sea sponges.

There is no standard term for line segments built on other regular tilings, an unstructured grid, or a simple connected graph, but both "polynema" and "polyedge" have been proposed.

When reflections are considered distinct we have the one-sided polysticks.  When rotations and reflections are not considered to be distinct shapes, we have the free polysticks.  Thus, for example, there are 7 one-sided square tristicks because two of the five shapes have left and right versions.<ref>[http://www.solitairelaboratory.com/polyenum.html Counting polyforms, at the Solitaire Laboratory]</ref>

The set of n-sticks that contain no closed loops is equivalent, with some duplications, to the set of (n+1)-ominos, as each vertex at the end of every line segment can be replaced with a single square of a polyomino. In general, an n-stick with m loops is equivalent to a (n−m''+1)-omino (as each loop means that one line segment does not add a vertex to the figure).

Diagram

References

External links
 Polysticks Puzzles & Solutions, at Polyforms Puzzler
 Covering the Aztec Diamond with One-sided Tetrasticks, Alfred Wassermann, University of Bayreuth, Germany
 Polypolylines, at Math Magic

Polyforms